The Atlanta Public Safety Training Center, commonly known as Cop City, is a police and fire services training center under construction near Atlanta, Georgia, United States.

For most of the 20th century the site was used as a prison, before being abandoned in 1995. It was identified by the City of Atlanta as the only suitable location to build the training center in 2021 and has been met with protests that started the same year. During the protests, known as the Stop Cop City movement, protestor Manuel Esteban Paez Teran was fatally shot by Atlanta Police in January 2023. Protestors have been arrested in late 2022 and early 2023 and charged with domestic terrorism offenses. The validity of the terrorism-related charges has been called into question and attracted controversy.

Description 
The $90 million construction of the Atlanta Public Safety Training Center is underway on a 85-acre plot of land in the South River Forest, DeKalb County, Georgia. The land is owned by the City of Atlanta.

Once complete, the center is planned to be used as a training center for police and fire services and is expected to open in the fourth quarter of 2023. Facilities at the site will include classrooms, a burn building, a mock city, and a shooting range. 265 surrounding acres of the site will be used as "green-space".

Construction 
Terracon Consultants Inc. are acting as consultants to project clients Altanta Police Foundations Inc.

History 

The site was initially purchased in 1863 by the City of Atlanta for use as a cemetery during the American Civil War, but was never used for that purpose. The land was purchased by the federal government in 1917 to be used as a prisoner-of-war camp, and used as the Atlanta Prison Farm from 1920 until 1995. After being vacated the building was used to illegally dump tires, and was damaged by serious fires in 2009 and 2017.

In 2021, Atlanta's Mayor Keisha Lance Bottoms, accompanied by Atlanta Police Foundation's CEO, said the site had been selected use as a training center was the only suitable location available to the city. She had earlier endorsed the use of the site in Spring of 2021. Pre-construction site clearing started in May 2022.
Since 2021, the site has been the subject of public protests with protestors arrested in December 2022. In January 2023, 26-year-old protestor Manuel Esteban Paez Teran was fatally shot by police. According to a lawyer working on behalf of Teran's mother, an independent autopsy revealed "Both Manuel's left and right hands show exit wounds in both palms. The autopsy further reveals that Manuel was most probably in a seated position, cross-legged when killed."

On March 5, 2023 protestors threw large rocks, bricks, Molotov cocktails, and fireworks at police officers, and destroyed various construction vehicles. 35 people were detained, and 23 people were arrested and charged with domestic terrorism. Of the arrestees, one was from France, one was from Canada, and two were residents of Georgia. It was later reported that one of those 23 was a lawyer for the Southern Poverty Law Center who had only been there for observation. Because of this, the lawyer was freed on a $5,000 bond. None of the other 22 were offered bond.

References

External websites 

 Official website
Buildings and structures under construction in the United States
Police academies in the United States
Atlanta Police Department
2023 controversies in the United States